Atomicity may refer to:

Chemistry
 Atomicity (chemistry), the total number of atoms present in 1 molecule of a substance
 Valence (chemistry), sometimes referred to as atomicity

Computing
 Atomicity (database systems), a property of database transactions which are guaranteed to either completely occur, or have no effects
 Atomicity (programming), an operation appears to occur at a single instant between its invocation and its response
 Atomicity, a property of an S-expression, in a symbolic language like Lisp

Mathematics
 Atomicity, an element of orthogonality in a component-based system
 Atomicity, in order theory; see Atom (order theory)

See also
 Atom (disambiguation)